The canton of La Vallée de l'Arros et des Baïses is an administrative division of the Hautes-Pyrénées department, southwestern France. It was created at the French canton reorganisation which came into effect in March 2015. Its seat is in Tournay.

It consists of the following communes:
 
Argelès-Bagnères
Arrodets
Artiguemy
Asque
Banios
Barbazan-Dessus
Batsère
Bégole
Benqué-Molère
Bernadets-Dessus
Bettes
Bonnemazon
Bonrepos
Bordes
Bourg-de-Bigorre
Bulan
Burg
Caharet
Calavanté
Castelbajac
Castéra-Lanusse
Castillon
Chelle-Spou
Cieutat
Clarac
Esconnets
Escots
Espèche
Espieilh
Fréchendets
Fréchou-Fréchet
Galan
Galez
Goudon
Gourgue
Hauban
Hitte
Houeydets
Lanespède
Lespouey
Lhez
Libaros
Lies
Lomné
Luc
Lutilhous
Marsas
Mascaras
Mauvezin
Mérilheu
Montastruc
Moulédous
Oléac-Dessus
Orieux
Orignac
Oueilloux
Ozon
Péré
Peyraube
Poumarous
Recurt
Ricaud
Sabarros
Sarlabous
Sentous
Sinzos
Tilhouse
Tournay
Tournous-Devant
Uzer

References

Cantons of Hautes-Pyrénées